Carabus sylvestris sylvestris is a subspecies of brown-coloured beetle from family Carabidae, found in Austria, Czech Republic, France, Germany, Italy, Liechtenstein, Poland, and Switzerland.

References

sylvestris sylvestris
Beetles described in 1793